From.9 is the first special single album of the South Korean girl group, Fromis 9. The single album was released on October 10, 2018 by Off the Record Entertainment and distributed by Stone Music and Genie Music. The album's lead single is "Love Bomb".

From.9 marks the first comeback of the group with Jang Gyu-ri after her absence due to participating in Produce 48. This single album also marks their first release under Off the Record after officially signed with them last September.

Background and release
On October 2, 2018, the group released teaser images for their comeback. The next day, through their official YouTube channel, they dropped a behind-the-scenes video of their preparations for their comeback as a 9-member group with Jang Gyu-ri's participation.
 
On October 4, 2018, it was announced via their SNS accounts that the single album would have 5 songs, with 3 new songs and 2 re-released songs from their last mini-album, To. Day, with "Love Bomb" as the lead single.

Promotion
The group, through their SNS accounts, put up an invitation for a performance on October 5 at Gangnam station Exit 11.

Track listing

Charts

Release history

Notes

References

2018 albums
Fromis 9 albums
Korean-language albums
Hybe Corporation albums